Juchnowiec Kościelny  is a village in Białystok County, Podlaskie Voivodeship, in north-eastern Poland. It is the seat of the gmina (administrative district) called Gmina Juchnowiec Kościelny.

The village has a population of 160.

References

Villages in Białystok County